Chambon-le-Château is a former commune in the Lozère department in southern France. On 1 January 2019, it was merged into the new commune Bel-Air-Val-d'Ance.

See also
Communes of the Lozère department

References

Chambonlechateau
Populated places disestablished in 2019